A manual labor college was a type of school in the United States, primarily between 1825 and 1860, in which work, usually agricultural or mechanical, supplemented academic activity.

The manual labor model was intended to make educational opportunities more widely available to students with limited means, and to make the schools more viable economically. The work was seen as morally beneficial as well as healthful; at the time, this was innovative and equalitarian thinking.

According to the trustees of the Lane Theological Seminary:

These "colleges" usually included what we would today (2019) call high school ("preparatory") as well as college level instruction. At the time, the only public schools were at the elementary level, and there were no rules distinguishing colleges from high schools.

The four states with the largest number of such schools were New York, Ohio, Indiana, and Illinois.

George W. Gale
George W. Gale was the founder of the first and best-known American example, the Oneida Institute of Science and Industry, and he thought the concept was his, although there are European predecessors. He and many of the other pious Yankees were persuaded that manual labor was to be the central practical feature of the coming American, Christian program of education. In 1830 Gale wrote: "Depend on it, Brother Finney, none of us have estimated the importance of this System of Education. It will be to the moral world what the lever of Archimedes, could he have found a fulcrum, would have been to the natural." As he put it slightly later, in his circular and plan for Knox College, "the manual labor system, if properly sustained and conducted, ...is peculiarly adapted...to qualify men for the self-denying and arduous duties of the gospel ministry, especially in our new settlements and missionary fields abroad."

Theodore Weld and the Society for Promoting Manual Labor in Literary Institutions
Theodore Dwight Weld had studied under Gale for three years, and was convinced of the wisdom of the manual labor movement. He was a highly successful young lecturer on temperance, and caught the attention of the philanthropist Tappan brothers, Arthur and Lewis. They invited him to New York and tried to get him to accept an appointment as minister, but he declined, saying he was not prepared. Since he was "a living, breathing, and eloquently-speaking exhibit of the results of manual-labor-with-study,", the brothers, trying to support and encourage him, hired him for a year as an agent of the manual labor movement. For the purpose they created in 1831 a Society for Promoting Manual Labor in Literary Institutions, "literary institutions" being non-theological schools, as in "In every literary institution there are a number of hours daily, in which nothing is required of the student." The only known activities of the Society were hiring Weld for the year 1832, hosting him as speaker,
and publishing his report.

According to its constitution, it was "the object of this society to collect and diffuse information, calculated to promote the establishment and prosperity of manual labor schools and seminaries in the United States, and to introduce the system of manual labor into institutions now established." The Society's charge to Weld is lost, but to judge from his 100-page, carefully organized report, he was charged with traveling and investigating manual labor education as it then existed, and making suggestions for its improvement and prosperity. "We wish you to keep a minute and accurate journal of your tour, embracing all the facts which you collect, with such remarks and inferences as you may think proper." He was also "to ascertain to what extent the manual labor system was suited to conditions in the West" (the Ohio valley). He was "to find a site for a great national manual labor institution where training for the western ministry could be provided for poor but earnest young men who had dedicated their lives to the home missionary cause in the 'vast valley of the Mississippi.'"

In Weld's January, 1833, report to the Society he stated that "In prosecuting the business of my agency, I have traveled during the year four thousand five hundred and seventy-five miles miles [7,364 km]; in public conveyances [boat and stagecoach], 2,630 [4,230 km]; on horseback, 1,800 [2,900 km]; on foot, 145 [233 km]. I have made two hundred and thirty-six public addresses." A newspaper published a summary of his report:

Weld recommended Cincinnati, which he visited twice, as "the logical location [for the new school]. Cincinnati was the focal center of population and commerce in the Ohio valley." The new and barely-functioning Lane Theological Seminary in Walnut Hills, Ohio, near Cincinnati, was coincidentally looking for students. On Weld's recommendation, the Tappans chose it as the site for a national institution. See Lane Theological Seminary for more on it. With Weld very much at the head of it, the first national debate on slavery in the United States was held there, followed by the first organized student movement; students resigned en masse, many going to the new Oberlin Collegiate Institute.

The need for a New England school
The New Hampshire Anti-Slavery Society, at its first convention, in 1834, passed a resolution expressing its support for the New England Anti-Slavery Society's resolution calling for a manual labor school "in some most eligible portion of New England", to address "the general want of mental cultivation of the colored population of our country".

The failure of manual labor in colleges
Although a variety of colleges incorporated manual labor to some degree, in most cases it was abandoned after only a few years, and it was all but gone by 1850. According to Herbert Lull, the reasons for its failure are:

 Labor was treated as a source of revenue, to support unrelated college activities.
 The labor was not linked in any way to the students' educational or career goals. Agricultural labor, for example, was of little relevance to the student preparing for a pulpit.
 The work became drudgery. Students wanted some leisure, some play.
 The work did not fulfill the financial expectations colleges had of it.

As summarized by Geoffrey Blodgett in his analysis of its quick disappearance at Oberlin:

However, "the 'manual labor' movement waxed and waned in the 1830s, but in one form or another, its ideas never died." It is a predecessor of the land-grant university, a generation later. And in 1917, Oberlin graduate L. L. Nunn founded Deep Springs College, which incorporates a version of the manual labor model into its governing philosophy.

Incomplete list of manual labor schools
Albany Manual Labor Academy, Albany, Ohio, 1850–1862. (See African American education in Albany.)
Aurora Manual-Labor Seminary
Bristol College, Bucks County, Pennsylvania, 1833–1837.
British-American Institute, Dawn, Ontario, Canada
Burnt Prairie Manual Labor Seminary
Chatham Manual Labor College in Illinois
Fayette Manual Labor Seminary in Illinois
Franklin Manual Labor College, later Franklin College (Indiana)
Genesee Manual-Labor School
Indiana Baptist Manual-Labor Institute, which became Franklin College (Indiana)
Jackson College (Tennessee) began as Spring Hill Manual Labor Academy in 1830
Knox Manual Labor College in Illinois; became Knox College in 1857
Lane Seminary, Cincinnati, modeled on Oneida until departure of the Lane Rebels in 1834.
Maine Wesleyan Seminary, which opened in 1825, the earliest example in the U.S.
 Manual Labor Academy (Spring Hill, Tennessee), later Jackson College (defunct)
 Manual Labor Academy of Pennsylvania, Germantown, Philadelphia, Pennsylvania
 Marion College in Marion County, Missouri
 New-York Central College, 1849–1860
 Oberlin Collegiate Institute 1835–, later Oberlin College.
 Oneida Institute of Science and Industry, later Oneida Institute, in Whitesboro, New York, founded in 1828 by Gale
 Pawlet Academy, Pawlet, Vermont
 Peterboro Manual Labor School "for young men of color" (1834–1836), in Peterboro, New York, created and funded by philanthropist Gerrit Smith
 Rochester Institute of Practical Education, Rochester, New York, 1831–1832 Perhaps the same as the Rochester Institute of Science and Industry, which took Oneida as a model.
 Shawnee Indian Methodist Manual Labor School, Kansas
 Sheffield Manual Labor Institute, affiliated with Oberlin
 Union Literary Institute, Randolph County, Indiana, which accepted students of any race and was called "a nigger school"
Wabash Manual-Labor Seminary, later Wabash College
 Western Scientific and Agricultural College
 Woodstock Manual Labor Institute, Woodstock, Michigan, 1844–1850s
Yates Polytechnic Institute, Chittenango, New York

A considerable list of other manual labor schools, and not just in Indiana, is found on pp. 74–77 of Richard Gause Boone's A History of Education in Indiana (1892). Boone calls the manual labor movement "a 'craze', that soon ran its course (p. 76).

See also
 List of industrial schools
 Cooperative education
 Federal Work-Study Program
 Land-grant university
 Work college
 Work-study

References

Further reading
 
 
 Power, Edward J. "Hand and Head: The Manual Labor School Movement", A Legacy of Learning: A History of Western Education. Albany, N.Y: State University of New York Press, 1991.
 

 

Higher education in the United States
History of education in the United States
History of universities and colleges in the United States
American manual labor schools
 Manual Labor